is a Japanese footballer who plays for Montedio Yamagata.

Career statistics

Club
Updated to the start of 2023 season.

References

External links

Profile at Fagiano Okayama

1994 births
Living people
Meiji University alumni
Association football people from Ehime Prefecture
Japanese footballers
J2 League players
Fagiano Okayama players
Ehime FC players
Association football forwards